Wugong may refer to:

 Wugong County, in Shaanxi, China
 Wugong, Henan
 Wugong, Hebei
 Wugong Mountains,  a range of mountains located in Jiangxi and Hunan, China
 Chinese martial arts, also known as Wugong (武功)